, was a Japanese independent theater troupe co-founded by Shūji Terayama and whose members include Kohei Ando, Kujō Kyōko, Yutaka Higashi, Tadanori Yokoo, and Fumiko Takagi.

It was led by Shūji Terayama and active between 1967 and 1983 (until Terayama's death). A major phenomenon on the Japanese Angura ("underground") theater scene, the group has produced a number of stage works marked by experimentalism, folklore influences, social provocation, grotesque eroticism and the flamboyant fantasy characteristic of Terayama's oeuvre. Tenjō Sajiki benefitted greatly from collaborations with a number of prominent artists, including musicians J. A. Seazer and Kan Mikami, and graphic designers Aquirax Uno and Tadanori Yokoo.

The name is from 天井桟敷の人々, the Japanese title of the film Children of Paradise.

Stage productions
(arranged by the year of premiere performance)

1967
 The Hunchback of Aomori (青森県のせむし男)
 The Crime of Fatso Oyama (大山デブコの犯罪)
 Mink Marie (毛皮のマリー, La Marie-vison)
 Hanafuda denki (花札伝綺)

1968
 Shinjuku Tales of 1001 Nights (新宿版千一夜物語)
 Bluebeard (青ひげ)
 伯爵令嬢小鷹狩掬子の七つの大罪
 Farewell, cinema! (さらば映画よ)
 瞼の母
 昭和白虎隊外伝
 Throw away your books, rally in the streets! (書を捨てよ街へ出よう)
 The Little Prince (星の王子さま)

1969
 Our age comes riding on a circus elephant (時代はサーカスの象に乗って)
 Inugami (犬神)
 The Crime of Dr. Caligari (ガリガリ博士の犯罪)

1970
 Yes (イエス)
 Baron Burabura (ブラブラ男爵)
 Tokyo Year Zero (東京零年)
 Man-powered plane Solomon (人力飛行機ソロモン)

1971
 Heretics (邪宗門)
 地獄より愛を込めて

1972
 Run, Melos! (走れメロス)
 The Opium War (阿片戦争)
 人力飛行機ソロモンの組立て方

1973
 地球空洞説
 ある家族の血の起源
 Blind Man's Letters (盲人書簡)
 Origin of Blood

1975
 Knock (ノック)
 Chronicles of a Plague (疫病流行記)
 The Nail (釘)

1976
 Ship of Folly (阿呆船)
 The Laws of Gravitation (引力の法則)

1977
 The Miraculous Mandarin (中国の不思議な役人)

1978
 Directions to Servants (奴婢訓)
 Shintokumaru (身毒丸)
 (The Audience's Seats) 観客席

1979
 The Lemmings (レミング)
 Child-hunting (こども狩り)
 Duke Bluebeard's Castle (青ひげ公の城)

1981
 One Hundred Years of Solitude (百年の孤独)

Selected performances abroad
 1969: Inugami and La Marie-vison in Frankfurt.
 1970: La Marie Vison at La MaMa Experimental Theater Club in New York, with American actors and highly original staging (Eleonore Lester, There will be no audience, in New York Times, July 5, 1970, p. 12). The audience had to visit the actors in separate rooms, and could not see the entire performance.
 1971: Heretics and Man-powered plane Solomon at Festival mondial de théâtre in Nancy; La Marie-vison at Théâtre des Halles in Paris and Heretics at Mickery Theatre in Amsterdam and also in Belgrade.
 1972: Hanafuda denki at Théâtre Pigalle  in Paris; Run, Melos! at Spielstrasse in Munich and The Opium War at Mickery Theatre in Amsterdam.
 1973: Performances of Origin of Blood at the Shiraz-Persepolis Festival in Iran, the Netherlands and Poland.
 1976: Performances of Ship of Folly at the Shiraz-Persepolis Festival in Iran.
 1978: Directions to Servants at Mickery Theatre in Amsterdam.

External links
 Ian Buruma on Tenjo Sajiki in Amsterdam
 An interview with Terayama's assistant director Henrikku Morisaki.
 A review of Tenjo Sajiki performances in Munich (in German)
 Historical photo of the facade of Tenjo Sajiki Shibuya theater.

References 

Theatre in Japan
Performing groups established in 1967
Performing groups disestablished in 1983
1967 establishments in Japan
1983 disestablishments in Japan